The Xirka Ġieħ ir-Repubblika is a society of honour that offers membership to those who have demonstrated exceptional merit in the service of Malta or of humanity. Its motto is Għall-Ġid tal-Maltin ("For the Benefit of the Maltese").

Award 
The Xirka is limited to twenty members.  With the exception of honorary members, the number of new members may not exceed three persons for every two years. Once the maximum number of members has been met, a new member cannot be appointed until a vacancy occurs. 

Maltese nationals and distinguished citizens of other countries may be appointed as honorary members of the Xirka. Members and honorary members are legally entitled to have the initials "S.Ġ." (Sieħeb il-Ġieħ) placed after their names.

Insignia 

The Badge of the Order, an enameled representation of La Valletta's Bartizan, is surrounded by a white band with golden inscriptions. The order's motto appears at the top and its name, "Ġieħ ir-Repubblika" at the bottom.  The whole is surrounded by a gold and green wreath of laurel leaves. Additionally, hanging over a golden dove resting on a golden band is the order's s date of establishment: 1975.

The breast-star of the Order has the same design as the badge, but resting on a radiating golden sun.

The ribbon of the Order is red with two white borders.

Notable honorary members 

 Queen Elizabeth II, S.Ġ. 23 November 2005
 Queen Sofia of Spain, S.Ġ. 25 November 2009
 Colonel Muammar Gaddafi, S.Ġ. 5 December 1975 (revoked 26 August 2011) 
 Giovanni Leone, President of Italy, S.Ġ. 6 December 1975
 Li Xiannian, President of the People's Republic of China, S.Ġ. 22 November 1984
 Kim Il-sung, President of North Korea, S.Ġ. 1 August 1985
 José Manuel Barroso, S.Ġ. 10 October 1994
 President Carlo Azeglio Ciampi, of Italy, S.Ġ. 19 May 2005
 President Vaira Vike-Freiberga,  of Latvia, S.Ġ. 19 June 2006
 General Harald Kujat
 Ingrid Rüütel, wife of Arnold Rüütel, President of Estonia, S.Ġ. 1 October 2003
 Imants Freibergs, husband of Vaira Vike-Freiberga, S.Ġ. 16 February 2004
 Fotini Papadopoulou, wife of Tassos Papadopoulos (President of Cyprus), S.Ġ. 17 February 2005
  Kateryna Yushchenko, wife of Viktor Yushchenko, President of Ukraine, S.Ġ. 9 July 2008
 Maria Alves Da Silva Cavaco Silva, wife of Aníbal Cavaco Silva, President of Portugal, S.Ġ. 12 November 2008
 Maria Kaczyńska, First Lady of Poland, S.Ġ.  26 January 2009
 Zorka Parvanova, wife of Georgi Parvanov, President of Bulgaria, S.Ġ. 20 October 2009
 Maria Băsescu, wife of Traian Băsescu, President of Romania, S.Ġ. 30 June 2010
 Günter Verheugen, S.Ġ. 17 March 2004
 George Iacovou, Cypriot Minister of Foreign Affairs, S.Ġ. 17 February 2005
 Dalia Grybauskaitė, President of Lithuania, S.Ġ. 29 May 2012

References

External links 

 Honorary Members
 Honours and Awards

Orders, decorations, and medals of Malta
Orders of chivalry awarded to heads of state, consorts and sovereign family members